The China Railways JF7 (解放7, Jiěfàng, "liberation") class steam locomotive was a class of 2-8-2 steam locomotives operated by the China Railway, built by the North British Locomotive Company and assembled by the Tangshan Arsenal, as well as American builders between 1913 and 1924.

Twenty-four of these locomotives were originally built for the Jingfeng Railway (also known as the Peking−Mukden Railway in English). After the Japanese established the puppet Provisional Government of the Republic of China in 1938 (part of the collaborationist Republic of China from 1940 to 1945), these and other privately owned railways in the territory of Provisional Government were nationalised to create the North China Transportation Company (a subsidiary of the South Manchuria Railway, which designated these the Mikana (ミカナ) class.

After the end of the Pacific War, these locomotives were passed on to the Republic of China Railway. After the establishment of the People's Republic of China, China Railways designated them ㄇㄎ7 (MK7) class in 1951, and subsequently 解放7 (JF7) class in 1959; they were numbered in the 3601–3650, though the total number of engines is unknown. 

JF7-3608 was seen at Yanzhou in 1981.The last of these locomotives were retired in 1990.

References

2-8-2 locomotives
Railway locomotives introduced in 1913
NBL locomotives
Steam locomotives of China
Standard gauge locomotives of China
Freight locomotives